Fable Frolic is the third and final studio album by Swedish death metal band Comecon. It was released in 1995 via Century Media Records. Contrary to the album credits, the drums were recorded using a drum computer; Jonas Fredriksson who is listed as a drummer does not exist. The vocals are handled by Marc Grewe of Morgoth.

Track listing
  "Soft, Creamy Lather"   – 3:49
  "How I Won the War"  – 3:17
  "Bovine Inspiration"  – 3:08
  "Frogs"  – 4:03
  "Ways of Wisdom (Serves Two)"  – 3:09
  "Propelling Scythes"  – 3:25
  "The Family Album"  – 2:49
  "Imploder"  – 3:14
  "It Wears Me Down"  – 2:40
  "Anaconda Charms Grass Snake"  – 3:20
  "Icons of Urine"  – 3:00
  "Sunday Stroll"  – 3:23
  "Canvas of History"  – 5:38
  ""  – 10:36

Credits 
 Rasmus Ekman – guitar, bass
 Pelle Ström – guitar, bass
 Marc Grewe – vocals

Comecon (band) albums
1995 albums